The South African National Editors’ Forum (SANEF) is a South African-based non-profit membership organisation for editors, senior journalists and journalism trainers. The SANEF supports South African journalism through a number of activities ranging from public statements supporting media freedom, running training programs for journalists, writing policy submissions to government, to sponsoring and conducting research into the state of the media in South Africa. The SANEF runs the annual Nat Nakasa award that recognises media practitioners that have improved South African journalism.

The SANEF was founded following the merger of the predominantly black South African Black Editors’ Forum and the predominantly white South African Conference of Editors in 1996, two years after South Africa's first post apartheid elections.

Activist Moses ka Moyo was a SANEF Council member.

References

South African journalists
Journalism-related professional associations
Journalism organizations
Organisations based in South Africa
1996 establishments in South Africa